Ticlla (possibly from Quechua for eyelash; two-colored, or for 'with alternating colors') is a  mountain in the Chila mountain range in the Andes of Peru, about  high. It is located in the Arequipa Region, Castilla Province, Chachas District. Tiklla lies at the Cacamayo (possibly from Quechua for "rock river"), east of Huayllayoc and southeast of Huamanripayoq.

References

Mountains of Peru
Mountains of Arequipa Region